Russkaya Zhuravka is a rural locality (a selo) in Verkhnemamonsky District of Voronezh Oblast in Russia, the administrative center of the Russko-Zhuravsky Rural Settlement. According to the Russian Census of 2010, Russkaya Zhuravka had 1,779 inhabitants.

References 

Rural localities in Verkhnemamonsky District
Pavlovsky Uyezd, Voronezh Governorate